Anwar Ratol (sometimes spelt Anwar Rataul) is a small, yellow variety of mango known for its sweetness and fiberlessness. It is sometimes called the 'mini powerhouse'. It is cultivated in the Punjab and Sindh regions of Pakistan, and near the village of Rataul in Uttar Pradesh, India. It is very sweet in taste with less fiber.

History 
Anwar Ratol was first cultivated near Rataul, a village in Uttar Pradesh. Sheikh Mohd Afaq Faridi, a Muslim farmer returned to the village after completing his inter college in 1905, he noticed a young mango tree near one of the farms. He asked a gardener to graft the plant, and in a year’s time, four mango trees sprouted. Years later, Afaq Faridi resigned from his job and devoted his life to this ‘sweet mission’. After his marriage, he set up a mango nursery that he called Shohra-e-afaq in 1928 and got it registered in 1935. He named this mango variety Anwar Rataul, now popularly known simply as the Rataul mango. In 1947, someone took sample plants to Pakistan and planted this mango breed in the Multan region. The variety became famous, and symbol of pride for Pakistan.

Variations 
There are two variations of this mango:

The early season variety is fragile and prone to the climate elements. Much of the crop is destroyed by strong wind and heavy rain, but it is also the most popular and sweeter of the two varieties. Its growing season is very short - just a few weeks in May and June.

The late season variety is more stable, with a thicker skin and is less sweet. It grows in July and August.

Mango diplomacy 
Since 1981, Pakistan has been sending Anwar Ratol to heads of state and diplomats as part of its mango diplomacy to promote their mangoes around the world and create better relations with other countries like Australia and India.

See also 
 List of mango cultivars

Further reading

References 

Mango cultivars of India
Mango cultivars of Pakistan